Sulfuryl diazide or sulfuryl azide is a chemical compound with the molecular formula . It was first described in the 1920s when its reactions with benzene and p-xylene were studied by Theodor Curtius and Karl Friedrich Schmidt. The compound is reported as having "exceedingly explosive, unpredictable properties" and "in many cases very violent explosions occurred without any apparent reason".

It was not until 2011 that sulfuryl diazide was isolated in a pure enough state to be fully characterized. It was characterized by infrared and Raman spectroscopy; its structure in the solid state was determined by x-ray crystallography. Its melting point is -15 °C. It was prepared by the reaction of sulfuryl chloride with sodium azide using acetonitrile as solvent:

Sulfuryl diazide has been used as a reagent to perform reactions that remove nitrogen from heterocyclic compounds:

See also
 Trifluoromethanesulfonyl azide

References

Azido compounds
Sulfuryl compounds
Substances discovered in the 1920s